Pyroxenite Promontory is a promontory rising to about  near the west end of Dufek Massif in the Pensacola Mountains of Antarctica. The feature is located west of Neuburg Peak and projects northwest toward Rautio Nunatak. The name was proposed by Arthur B. Ford, leader of the United States Geological Survey (USGS) geological party in the Pensacola Mountains, 1978–79, from the pyroxenite rock which forms a conspicuous dark layer along the cliffs of the promontory.

Promontories of Antarctica
Landforms of Queen Elizabeth Land